Joseph McGee could refer to: 

Joe McGee (American football) (1902–1958), football and basketball coach
Joseph McGee (bishop) (1904–1983), Scottish Roman Catholic clergyman
Joseph H. McGee Jr. (born 1929), American lawyer and politician
Joe McGee (English footballer) (born 1993), midfielder for Buxton
Joseph McGee (general), U.S. Army general